The  key is commonly found on desktop and laptop keyboards. The key has the opposite effect of the End key.

Its standard symbol  from ISO/IEC 9995-7, ie. , is used on some full-size keyboards instead of a possibly localized text label.

Microsoft Windows
In modern Microsoft Windows text editing applications, it is primarily used to return the cursor to the beginning of the line where the cursor is located.

macOS
Only full-sized Apple keyboards have a  key. In macOS single line text fields, the key works like it does in DOS and MS Windows, going back to the days of dumb terminals, where Home moves to the start of the line. In multiline word processors, when the key is pressed, the window scrolls to the top, while the caret position does not change at all; that is, the  key is tied to the current window, not the text box being edited. On Apple keyboards that do not have a Home key, one can press  for the Home key functionality described above.  To get the same result as the Windows platform (that is, moving the insertion point to the beginning of the current line of text), one can press  . An application can also be used to change this behaviour.

Linux
In Linux, the  key has basically the same functionality as it does on Windows. It returns the cursor to the beginning of the line in editable text, and otherwise scrolls a scrollable document to the beginning.

Non-GUI applications
A  key was present on the ADM-3A and many other pre-PC dumb terminal keyboards. Its application here was to return the text cursor to the beginning of the screen line.

References 

Computer keys